Cynthia Martinez is an American voice actress who works for ADV Films and Seraphim Digital/Sentai Filmworks. Her first roles were that of Lina Inverse in the Slayers movies and OVAs and as Hermes in the original anime adaptation of Kino's Journey. Besides these, she is also known for the lead roles of Mayu from Elfen Lied, Illyasviel von Einzbern from the Fate/kaleid liner Prisma Illya series, Tami Nishimikado from Hanayamata and Sora Naegino from Kaleido Star, and Mikako Nagamine from Makoto Shinkai's Voices of a Distant Star. She was announced as a guest of honor for the Ani-Jam convention in 2013. In 2021 she was participe in Secret Story, this is a TV show from Spain

Filmography

Anime

Film

References

External links
Cynthia Martinez at the CrystalAcids Anime Voice Actor Database

20th-century American actresses
21st-century American actresses
American voice actresses
Place of birth missing (living people)
Year of birth missing (living people)
Living people